Krali Bimbalov (1 November 1934 – 1988) was a Bulgarian wrestler who competed in the 1960 Summer Olympics and in the 1964 Summer Olympics.

References

External links
 

1934 births
1988 deaths
Olympic wrestlers of Bulgaria
Wrestlers at the 1960 Summer Olympics
Wrestlers at the 1964 Summer Olympics
Bulgarian male sport wrestlers
Olympic silver medalists for Bulgaria
Olympic medalists in wrestling
People from Burgas Province
Medalists at the 1960 Summer Olympics
20th-century Bulgarian people